Khonsari (related to Khvansar or Khvansar County in Isfahan Province, Iran) is a Persian language surname which can also be found among the Iranian diaspora. Notable people with the surname include:

 Ahmad Khonsari (1887–1985), Iranian Grand Ayatollah
 Mehrdad Khonsari (born 1949), former Iranian diplomat and veteran politician
 Michael M. Khonsari (born 19??), American mechanical engineer
 Navid Khonsari (born 1970), Iranian-Canadian video game, film and graphic novel creator, writer, director and producer
 Darius Khonsary (born 19??), Iranian descent American fine jewelry designer, and artist

See also 
 Khansari, another transcription of the same Iranian surname== See also ==
 Khonsary, another transcription of the same Iranian surname

References 

Persian-language surnames